Carol Carson (born September 5, 1945) is a former Canadian politician who served in the Legislative Assembly of Saskatchewan from 1991 to 1995, as a NDP member for the constituency of Melfort.

References

Saskatchewan New Democratic Party MLAs
1945 births
Living people
Women MLAs in Saskatchewan
People from Nipawin, Saskatchewan
20th-century Canadian legislators
21st-century Canadian women politicians
20th-century Canadian women politicians